Jeevikkan Anuvadikku is a 1967 Indian Malayalam film, directed by P. A. Thomas and produced by N. Prakash. The film stars Prem Nazir, Adoor Bhasi, Manavalan Joseph and Pattom Sadan in the lead roles. The film had musical score by Vijayabhaskar.

Cast

Prem Nazir
Adoor Bhasi
Manavalan Joseph
Pattom Sadan
T. R. Omana
T. S. Muthaiah
Kottarakkara Sreedharan Nair
Meena
K. S. Parvathy
K. V. Shanthi
T. K. Balachandran
Ushakumari
Vidhubala

Soundtrack
The music was composed by Vijayabhaskar and the lyrics were written by P. Bhaskaran.

References

External links
 

1967 films
1960s Malayalam-language films
Films directed by P. A. Thomas